Murdo MacDonald may refer to:

 Sir Murdoch Macdonald (1866–1957), British politician
 Murdo Stewart MacDonald (1852–1938), last of the Sea-Barons
 Murdo Ewen Macdonald (1914–2004), Scottish minister
 Murdo McDonald (footballer) (1901–1934), Scottish footballer